The 1983-84 season was Arsenal's 65th consecutive season in the top flight of English football.

Season summary
The 1983-84 season was Terry Neill’s final season as the Gunners manager. Neill had persuaded Scottish starlet Charlie Nicholas to spurn the advances of Liverpool and move to London in time for the 1983-84 season in a club-record signing from Celtic.The move wasn’t a success, however, and by December Nicholas had only scored twice.

When Arsenal got knocked out of the League Cup at home by Walsall, it really turned the fans against Terry Neill, Arsenal were 16th in the table, then lost at home to West Bromwich Albion 1-0. There were angry demonstrations by the supporters outside the ground afterwards. Many fans wanted Neill out and after Arsenal lost 3-1 away at West Ham, on 16 December 1983 the club did the inevitable and sacked Neill. Don Howe first became caretaker-manager, and became permanent manager after the game against Leicester on 28 April 1984, following a run of five wins and two draws in the last seven games.  Arsenal were 6th – the highest position they had held that season after the second match of the season. Howe also brought Paul Mariner to Highbury in February 1984 for £150,000.

Squad

Top scorers

First Division
  Tony Woodcock 21
  Charlie Nicholas 11
  Paul Mariner 7
  Brian Talbot 6
  Stewart Robson 6

Results

First Division

Football League Cup

FA Cup

Arsenal entered the FA Cup in the third round proper, in which they were drawn to face Middlesbrough.

References

External links
 Arsenal 1983–84 on statto.com

Arsenal
Arsenal F.C. seasons